This is a list of the concert tours undertaken by American singer, songwriter, and actress Sabrina Carpenter.

Evolution Tour (2016-2017) 
The Evolution Tour was the first headlining concert tour by American singer Sabrina Carpenter, in support of her sophomore studio album Evolution (2016). The tour began on October 18, 2016, in Nashville, Tennessee, and concluded on May 21, 2017 in Milan, Italy.

Background 
On September 4, 2016, a day after the announcement of Evolution, Carpenter announced that she would be going on her first headlining tour entitled the "Evolution Tour". That same day she also announced the tour dates for the North American leg of the tour. On March 1, 2017, Carpenter announced the European Leg of the tour along with the dates.

Setlist 
This setlist is from the show in Nashville on October 18, 2016. It does not represent all concerts for the duration of the tour.
{{Div col|content=#"Smoke and Fire"
"Feels Like Loneliness"
"No Words"
"Heathens"
"Wildside"
"Can't Blame a Girl for Trying"
"Run and Hide"
"We'll Be the Stars"
"Thumbs"
"Mirage"
"Don't Want It Back"
"Hotline Bling"
"All We Have Is Love"
"Space"
"Eyes Wide Open"
"On Purpose"
Encore
"Shadows"}}

Shows

Cancelled shows

The De-Tour (2017) 
The De-tour is the second headlining concert tour by American singer Sabrina Carpenter. The tour began in Vancouver, British Columbia, on July 6, 2017 and concluded in Toronto, Ontario, on August 27, 2017. Carpenter announced the tour on April 26, 2017 along with the shows and the opening acts being New Hope Club and Alex Aiono.

Setlist 
This setlist is from the show in Vancouver on July 6, 2017. It does not represent all concerts for the duration of the tour.
{{Div col|content=#"Feels Like Loneliness"
"Smoke and Fire
"No Words"
"Hands"
"Run and Hide"
"Space"
"Mirage"
"Thumbs"
"All We Have Is Love"
"Into You"
"Can't Blame a Girl for Trying"
"We'll Be the Stars"
"Eyes Wide Open"
"Shadows"
"Wildside"
"Why"
"On Purpose"
Encore
"Alone Together"}}

Shows

Singular Tour (2019) 

The Singular Tour is the third concert tour by American singer Sabrina Carpenter, in support of her third and fourth studio albums, Singular: Act I (2018) and Singular: Act II (2019). The tour began on March 2, 2019, in Orlando, Florida at the Universal Studios Park and concluded on April 11, 2019, in Singapore at the Kallang Theater.

Background 
On December 21, 2018, Carpenter announced the Asia leg of the Singular Tour. On January 28, 2019, Carpenter announced the North American leg of the tour along with the addition of the Singapore show on the Asia Leg. On February 1, 2019, tickets for both legs went on sale. On February 22, 2019, Carpenter announced that Maggie Lindemann would be the opening act for the North American leg of the tour.

Setlist 
This setlist is from the show in Orlando on March 2, 2019. It does not represent all concerts for the duration of the tour.
{{Div col|content=#"Almost Love"
"Bad Time"
"Alien"
"Mona Lisa"
"Diamonds Are Forever"/"Diamonds"
"Thumbs"
"On Purpose"
"Pushing 20"
"All We Have Is Love"
"Why"
"prfct"
"Paris"
"Hold Tight"
"Sue Me"
Encore
"Exhale"}}

Shows

Cancelled shows

Personnel

 Sabrina Carpenter — vocals, bass
 Sarah Carpenter — backing vocals
 Kat Cheng — backup dancer
 Andranita Smith-Shannon — backup dancer
 Caleb Nelson — guitar
 Tobias Urbanczyk — drums
 Korey Fells, Jr. — keyboard
 Amber Park — creative direction
 Toogie Barcelo — choreography
 Fabien Herrera — lighting design 
 Chad Fellers-Doughty — lighting design 
 Kevin Labitan — lighting design 
 Aron Fromm — design
 Robert Gotham — design
 Blunt Action — design
 Justin West — design
 Dustin Stanek — design
 After the Smoke — design
 Zouassi — design
 Marcello Ambriz — photography

Credits adapted from Instagram and Amber Park's website.

Emails I Can't Send Tour (2022-2023)

Shows

Notes

References 

Lists of concert tours